Syed Iqbal Hasnain is an Indian glaciologist, writer, educationist and the Chairman of the Glacier and Climate Change Commission of the Government of Sikkim. He is a former vice chancellor of the University of Calicut and a member of the United Nations Environment Program Committee on Global Assessment of Black Carbon and Troposphere Ozone.

Career 
Hasnain has served the Jawaharlal Nehru University as a professor of glaciology and has been associated with The Energy and Resources Institute (TERI) and the Centre for Policy Research, a social science research institute affiliated to the Indian Council of Social Science Research (ICSSR). A distinguished Visiting Fellow of the Stimson Center, he has delivered several orations and has written articles and a book on glaciology. 

The Government of India awarded him the fourth highest civilian honour of the Padma Shri, in 2009, for his contributions to studies on environment.

References

Further reading 
 
 

Recipients of the Padma Shri in other fields
Year of birth missing (living people)
20th-century Indian educational theorists
Glaciologists
Indian scientific authors
Academic staff of Jawaharlal Nehru University
Academic staff of the University of Calicut
Indian officials of the United Nations
Living people
Indian geologists
Scientists from Sikkim
20th-century Indian earth scientists